Markova: Comfort Gay is a 2000 Filipino biographical-comedy, drama film written by Clodualdo Del Mundo Jr. and directed by Gil M. Portes.  It was based loosely on the life of Walter Dempster Jr., the last surviving Filipino "comfort gay" (male sex slaves for Imperial Japanese Army) from World War II. The film tells the story of his hardships during his childhood and his travail during the World War II Japanese occupation of the Philippines. The character was played by actor Dolphy, who played the adult Markova while two of his sons, Eric Quizon and Jeffrey Quizon, played the role of two younger Markovas in two more different phases of his life.

The film was released theatrically on December 25, 2000, as one of the official entries for the 2000 Metro Manila Film Festival, winning Best Supporting Actor in the film festival and Gawad Urian Awards 2001 for Jeffrey Quizon. Aside from local acclaim, it also received international acclaim with the recognition of Prix de la Meilleure Interpretation to the father-and-sons Dolphy, Eric Quizon, and Jeffrey "Epy" Quizon at the 2001 Brussels International Film Festival.

Plot
After watching a documentary about the suffering of "comfort women" forced into sexual slavery during the Japanese occupation of the Philippines, Markova decides to tell his own painful story to reporter Loren Legarda. Escaping the torment of growing up with an abusive older brother, he and his gay friends found further suffering at the hands of Japanese soldiers, forced as sex slaves to survive. But even after the war, Markova's struggle continued.

Cast
Dolphy as Walter Dempster Jr./Walterina Markova (adult years)
Eric Quizon as Walterina Markova (during his middle years)
Epi Quizon as the young Markova
Ricci Chan as Anita
Melvin Lee as Carmen
R.S. Francisco as Minerva
Andoy Ranay as Sophie
Loren Legarda as herself
Joel Lamangan as Councilor Justo Justo
Dexter Doria as Markova's mother
Freddie Quizon as Robert
Chandro Concepcion as Roco
Gio Alvarez as the young gay assistant in shelter

Minor roles
 Greg Guerra as older Anita
 Chaning Carlos as older Carmen
 Andrew E. as Chiquito/"Tintoy"
 Daisy Reyes as Rosa
 Bembol Roco as Puging
 Bearwin Meily as Tuging
 Karla Estrada as Markova's talent for Japan

Digital restoration 
The film was digitally restored and remastered in 4K high definition by the ABS-CBN Film Restoration Project through the facilities of Central Digital Lab. Since the 35mm master negative print was well-preserved at the ABS-CBN Film Archives, the restoration team of Central Digital Lab took 260 hours to fix the images from instability and eliminating film grain, flicker, and optical dirt.  The restoration of the film was completed in 2019, a year before the shutdown of ABS-CBN and its controversial franchise denial in 2020. The 4K restored version of the film was premiered digitally on November 20, 2020, as part of the digital exhibition for the Pista ng Pelikulang Pilipino 2020.

Awards and recognitions

Official selections
2002 Seattle Lesbian and Gay Film Festival
2002 San Francisco International Lesbian and Gay Film Festival
2001 Brussels International Film Festival

2001 Brussels International Film Festival
Won Prix de la Meilleure Interpretation, Dolphy, Eric Quizon, and Jeffrey Quizon

2001 FAMAS Awards
Won Best Supporting Actor, Jeffrey Quizon
Won Best Production Design, Kay Abano
Nominated Best Actor, Dolphy
Nominated Best sound, Albert Michael Idioma and Rudy Gonzales

2001 Gawad Urian Awards
Won Best Supporting actor, Jeffrey Quizon
Nominated Best Actor, Dolphy
Nominated Best Music, Joy Marfil
Nominated Best Production Design, Kay Abano

2001 Young Critics Circle
Nominated Best Achievement in Cinematography and Visual Design, Johnny Araojo and Kay Abano
Nominated Best Performance by Male or Female, Adult or Child, Individual or Ensemble in Leading or Supporting Role, Dolphy

2000 Metro Manila Film Festival
Won Best Supporting Actor, Jeffrey Quizon

References

External links

2000 films
Philippine LGBT-related films
Philippine war drama films
Philippine biographical films
2000s Japanese-language films
2000s Tagalog-language films
World War II films
Japanese occupation of the Philippines films
2000s war drama films
Films directed by Gil Portes
2000 LGBT-related films